Some Tits, but No Bush is the debut EP by Israeli groove metal band Betzefer. It was self-produced and released on January 1, 2001.

Track listing

Personnel
Avital Tamir - lead vocals
Matan Cohen - guitars
Menashe "Mashy" Hazan - bass
Roey Berman - drums, percussion

Betzefer albums
2001 EPs